The Bethune–Cookman Wildcats are the athletic teams that represent Bethune–Cookman University in Daytona Beach, Florida. Bethune-Cookman is a member of the Southwestern Athletic Conference and participates in NCAA Division I Football Championship Subdivision (FCS)..

Bethune–Cookman fields 15 teams, 7 men's and 8 women's, and have won 31 MEAC titles; 14 in baseball, 1 in bowling, 1 in men's cross country, 2 in women's cross country, 3 in football, 2 in women's indoor track and field, 6 in softball and 2 in women's tennis in history of their athletic program.

Football

Basketball

Baseball

Athletic Director Lynn W. Thompson announced on July 26, 2011 that Jason Beverlin, the pitching coach at Tennessee for the past two seasons, would become the Wildcats' new head baseball coach. Beverlin replaced Mervyl Melendez. Under Melendez, the baseball team had achieved success, including five consecutive MEAC championships from 2000–2004, and six more from 2006–2011. In 2006, one of his players was credited with Player of the Year, Rookie of the Year, and Pitcher of the Year accolades. Melendez was voted MEAC Coach of the year 2000 and 2001. The Wildcats under Melendez have made regional appearances in every year from 2000–2004 and 2006–2011. Bethune–Cookman also claimed tournament championships in 1997 and 1999 under coach Richard Skeel and in 2012 in Beverlin's first season.

Softball
Laura Watten is the head coach for the Lady Wildcats softball team.

Golf
The men's and women's Wildcat golf teams are coached by Lortiz Clark (head coach) and Jack McClairen (assistant coach). The teams use Indigo Lakes Golf Club and LPGA International as their home fields during competitions.

References